Chaqalvand Rud-e Olya (also Romanized as Chaqalvand Rūd-e ‘Olyā and Chaghalvand Rūd-e ‘Olyā) is a village in Qaedrahmat Rural District, Zagheh District, Khorramabad County, Lorestan Province, Iran. At the 2006 census, its population was 365, in 77 families.

References 

Towns and villages in Khorramabad County